Dounia Coesens (born 20 September 1988) is a French actress. In 2012, Coesens competed on the television show Fort Boyard.

Filmography

Theater

References

External links

Official website

1988 births
Living people
French television actresses
French film actresses
French stage actresses
21st-century French actresses